Wouter De Vriendt (born 22 June 1977 in Ostend) is a Belgian politician, and member of Groen. He is currently a member of the Belgian Chamber of Representatives.

Biography
De Vriendt got a master's degree in Political science. After he finished his university studies, he did research on European politics, and international cooperation at the Free University of Brussels (VUB).

Political career
On 10 June 2007 he was elected as representative in the Belgian federal parliament for the first time.

Timeline
10/06/2007 – :  Representative (constituency of West Flanders)

References

Groen (political party) politicians
Living people
1977 births
Vrije Universiteit Brussel alumni
21st-century Belgian politicians
Members of the Chamber of Representatives (Belgium)